The Soviet Union's 1968 nuclear test series was a group of 17 nuclear tests conducted in 1968. These tests  followed the 1967 Soviet nuclear tests series and preceded the 1969 Soviet nuclear tests series.

References

1968
1968 in the Soviet Union
1968 in military history
Explosions in 1968